Northern California TRACON (NCT) (Terminal Radar Approach Control), or NorCal TRACON for short (pronounced "nor-cal tray-con"), also known as NorCal Approach, is an air traffic control facility that provides safety alerts, separation, and sequencing of air traffic arriving, departing, and transiting the airspace and airports in Northern California, United States. NCT is the 3rd busiest TRACON in the US. NorCal TRACON is the step between local control and an Air Route Traffic Control Center (ARTCC), in this case, Oakland Center. San Francisco International Airport is the 2nd largest airport in California and the largest airport serving Northern California.

When an arriving aircraft nears the Bay Area, Oakland Center advises it to contact NorCal TRACON. TRACON gives the arrival a descent profile, ILS and other landing aid clearances. During busy times, TRACON often has to hold aircraft in the air. After TRACON sets up the flight for an approach to landing, the flight contacts the air traffic control tower at the arrival airport for landing clearance.

See also
Southern California TRACON

References

Air traffic control in the United States
Buildings and structures in Sacramento County, California
Aviation in California
Rancho Cordova, California
Sacramento County, California